La Academia is a Paraguayan reality musical talent show that premiered May 28, 2013 on Telefuturo and ended on September 24, 2013. The show was hosted by Dani Da Rosa and was adapted from the Mexican program La Academia.

Structure 

The main being the main demands specialized in the areas of singing, dancing and acting. People vote for their favorite student and thus lower than the score and have to leave the academy.

Your casting will be done nationally up going in different cities finding new talent in cities like: Itauguá, Villarrica, Ciudad del Este, Asunción and ending in Encarnación. The casting will be after two weeks of February. The matter will be 15 to 50 years of both sexes with some sort of artistic knowledge as dancing, singing or acting.

They live in a house of 500 square meters, equipped with 30 cameras, pool and jacuzzi where classes will coexist and locked with peers having a weekly gig where they are evaluated by a critical and where they will go to be removed until the winner.

Annexes programs

The Debate 
This program is broadcast every Thursday at 21:00, it is hosted by entertainment journalist and TV host Mili Britez. The panelists are: Carmiña Masi, entertainment journalist, Nestor Amarilla, theater director and television (acting teacher of La Academia), and Marcelo Iripino, choreographer and dancer (artistic director of La Academia).

During the program is analyzed in the whole structure of the Academy, from the personal life of the participants to the conflicts in daily life.

The Academy: Live on the house 
Program broadcast from Tuesday to Sunday at 00:00 (Sundays at 23:30), in the house where it is transmitted live to the public, as the 24 hours of the academy is transmitted through cable.

Road to Fame 
Behind the scenes (BackStage) of everything that happened in the academy, at different times, morning, noon and night. Not confirmed who would be the presenter.

Seasons

First Generation 
The first generation of La Academia in Paraguay for the year 2013, it is currently transmitted.
The casting was conducted nationwide, in cities such as: Itaugua, Villarrica, Ciudad del Este, Asunción and ending at Encarnación. The 20 chosen are persons between 15 and 50 years old, of both sexes, with some sort of artistic knowledge of dancing, singing or acting.

Auditions

Contestants

Mexican TV Series

Mexican TV Series

See also 
 La Academia
 La Academia USA
 Akademi Fantasi Indosiar
 Akademi Fantasia (Malaysia)
 Academy Fantasia (Thailand)

References 

Interactive television
Paraguayan reality television series
La Academia
2013 Paraguayan television series debuts
2013 Paraguayan television series endings